Agusan del Sur College is an educational institution offering kindergarten to college courses in Bayugan, Agusan del Sur, Philippines. It was founded in 1966 by Inocencio P. Angeles and Clarita J. Angeles.

References

External links
Official website

Schools in Agusan del Sur
High schools in the Philippines
Elementary schools in the Philippines
Educational institutions established in 1966
1966 establishments in the Philippines